Purdy's Wharf is an office complex in Halifax, Nova Scotia, Canada. Built over the water at the edge of Halifax Harbour and resting on pilings, it consists of two office towers, and a smaller office structure called Purdy's Landing. The complex is located along the Halifax Waterfront Boardwalk.

History
The complex was developed by J.W. Lindsay Enterprises. The architect was Shore Tilbe Henschel Irwin Peters of Toronto, while the structural consultant was George Brandys and Associates Ltd., now known as BMR Structural Engineering, of Halifax. Construction began in 1983. The first phase of the development, the 18-storey Tower I, opened in May 1985. Built at a cost of around C$49 million, phase one also included a four-storey office building and a parking garage.

In January 1987, the developers announced that a second phase would be built. Comprising a 22-storey,  office tower and an expansion of the parking garage, the expansion was estimated to cost C$65 million. The same architecture firm was employed. The project was completed in 1989, coinciding with the beginning of the early 1990s recession, which impacted the real estate market and contributed to the complex suffering from a 35.2 per cent vacancy rate in 1990.

In January 1999, Olympia and York purchased a 47.5 per cent stake in the development for C$39.9 million. At that time, GWL Realty Advisors owned 47.5 per cent while J.W. Lindsay owned the remaining five per cent. In early 2000, J.W. Lindsay sold their share of the complex to the other two co-owners, which each increased their ownership to 50 per cent.

In July 2005, Olympia and York sold their 50 per cent stake to GWL Realty Advisors for C$63.0 million.

Design
Purdy's Wharf consists of two office towers, a four-storey building called Purdy's Landing, a seven-storey multistorey car park, and outdoor spaces including a wharf and green space. Purdy's Landing is commonly referred to as the "Xerox building", due to a large Xerox sign that used to hang on the exterior of the building. Pedways connect the complex to Casino Nova Scotia and the Downtown Halifax Link system.

Purdy's Wharf has a unique, energy-efficient cooling system that works by circulating sea water through a heat exchanger system with the building's cooling water. The colder sea water chills the building's cooling water, which is then circulated through the buildings.

Transport
The complex is located within walking distance of the main Halifax Transit bus terminal, Scotia Square Terminal, via an enclosed footbridge spanning the Cogswell Interchange. 

It is also a short walk from the Halifax Ferry Terminal.

See also
List of tallest buildings in Atlantic Canada

References

External links
Purdy's Wharf
Live Webcam of Halifax Harbour with Purdy's Wharf
JW Lindsay Enterprises Limited
Shore Tilbe Irwin & Partners

1985 establishments in Nova Scotia
Office buildings completed in 1985
Buildings and structures in Halifax, Nova Scotia
Postmodern architecture in Canada